The Men's hammer throw at the 2014 Commonwealth Games as part of the athletics programme took place at Hampden Park on 28 and 29 July 2014.

Results

Qualifying round

Final

References

Men's hammer throw
2014